Kenneth E. Wilzbach (October 14, 1920, Chicago – April 9, 2004, Bayside, California) was an American chemist, known for his contribution to biological and medical research through his development of tritium labelling in biological compounds. The Wilzbach method is named in his honor.

Biography
Wilzbach was born and raised in Chicago. He graduated in chemistry from the University of Chicago with a bachelor's degree in 1940 and a Ph.D. in 1946. He joined Argonne National Laboratory in 1950 and worked there for forty years as a senior chemist.

He was one of five winners of the 1961 Ernest O. Lawrence Award; his award in the Life Sciences division was for "his development of tritium labeling of biologically important compounds, which have permitted major advances in biology and medicine."

Wilzbach and his wife Eileen (née Marcin) had a 41-year marriage. She was born in 1924 and died in 1987. Upon his death he was survived by four sons, a daughter, nine grandchildren, and three great-grandchildren.

Selected publications
 
 
  (over 900 citations)

References

1920 births
2004 deaths
20th-century American chemists
University of Chicago alumni
Argonne National Laboratory people
Scientists from Chicago